The Western Reserve Transit Authority is the operator of mass transportation in Mahoning County, Ohio. Service is provided throughout metropolitan Youngstown via twenty-seven fixed routes. These routes operate six days per week in the county and five days a week in Warren, Ohio.

Routes

Youngstown Local Service 
1 - Elm St
2 - Oak St
3 - Wilson Ave
4 - Steel St
5 - South Ave
6 - Fifth Ave
7 - Glenwood Ave
8 - Market St
9 - Austintown
10 - Belmont Ave
11 - Cornersburg
12 - Lansdowne Blvd
13 - McGuffey Rd
14 - Mosier
15 - Zedaker St
27 - Austintown Loop
28 - Warren Express

Warren Local Service 
70 – Southeast Warren
71 – North Warren
73 – West Warren
74 – Elm Rd

Suburban Loops/Crosstowns 
24 - Midlothian Blvd Crosstown
25 - Boardman/Canfield Loop
26 - Boardman East Loop

Express Services 
76 - North Jackson Express
80 - Lordstown Express
81 - Akron Express

Bus transportation in Ohio
Transportation in Youngstown, Ohio
Transportation in Mahoning County, Ohio